Stahlman is a surname. Notable people with the surname include:

Dick Stahlman (born 1902), American football offensive lineman
Edward Bushrod Stahlman (1843–1930), German-born American businessman
James Geddes Stahlman (1893–1976), Tennessee newspaper publisher and philanthropist
Mildred T. Stahlman (born 1922), professor of pediatrics and pathology at Vanderbilt University
Sylvia Stahlman (1929–1998), American soprano, particularly associated with light, coloratura roles

See also
Mount Stahlman, mountain at the west end of the Tapley Mountains in the Queen Maud Mountains, Antarctica
Stahlman Point, mountain that liesin Linn County, Oregon about two miles south of the town of Detroit
The Stahlman, 12 story building regarded as Nashville's second skyscraper
Stahlmania
Stahlmann
Stallman
Stallmann
Stalman
Stalmans